The 24th Filmfare Awards were held in 1977. 

Kabhi Kabhie led the ceremony with 13 nominations, followed by Mausam with 8 nominations and Chhoti Si Baat with 6 nominations.

The awards were spread over a number of films, with no film clearly dominating the event. However, based on awards tally, Kabhi Kabhie won 4 awards, thus becoming the most-awarded film at the ceremony.

Basu Chatterjee received dual nominations for Best Director for his direction in Chitchor and Chhoti Si Baat, but lost to Gulzar who won the award for Mausam.

Sanjeev Kumar received dual nominations for Best Actor for his performances in Arjun Pandit and Mausam, winning for the former.

Raakhee received dual nominations for Best Actress for her performances in Kabhi Kabhie and Tapasya, winning for the latter, her first and only win in the category.

Prem Chopra received dual nominations for Best Supporting Actor for his performances in Do Anjaane and Mehbooba, winning for the former.

Main awards

Best Film
 Mausam 
Chitchor
Chhoti Si Baat
Kabhi Kabhie
Tapasya

Best Director
 Gulzar – Mausam 
Basu Chatterjee – Chitchor
Basu Chatterjee – Chhoti Si Baat
Rajkumar Kohli – Nagin
Yash Chopra – Kabhi Kabhie

Best Actor
 Sanjeev Kumar – Arjun Pandit 
Amitabh Bachchan – Kabhi Kabhie
Amol Palekar – Chhoti Si Baat
Dilip Kumar – Bairaag
Sanjeev Kumar – Mausam

Best Actress
 Raakhee – Tapasya 
Hema Malini – Mehbooba
Raakhee – Kabhi Kabhie
Reena Roy – Nagin
Sharmila Tagore – Mausam

Best Supporting Actor
 Prem Chopra – Do Anjaane 
Ashok Kumar – Chhoti Si Baat
Prem Chopra – Mehbooba
Shashi Kapoor – Kabhi Kabhie
Vinod Khanna – Hera Pheri

Best Supporting Actress
 Kajri – Balika Badhu 
Asha Parekh – Udhar Ka Sindoor
Bindu – Arjun Pandit
Dina Pathak – Mausam
Waheeda Rehman – Kabhi Kabhie

Best Comic Actor
 Asrani – Balika Vadhu 
Asrani – Choti Si Baat
Deven Verma – Arjun Pandit
Deven Verma – Ek Se Badhkar Ek
Mehmood – Sabse Bada Rupaiya

Best Story
 Arjun Pandit – Balachand Mukherjee 
Kabhi Kabhie – Pamela Chopra
Mausam – Kamleshwar
Mehbooba – Gulshan Nanda
Tapasya – Ashapoorna Devi

Best Screenplay
 Choti Si Baat – Basu Chatterjee

Best Dialogue
 Kabhi Kabhie – Sagar Sarhadi

Best Music Director 
 Kabhi Kabhie – Khayyam 
Bairaag – Kalyanji Anandji
Chitchor – Ravindra Jain
Mausam – Madan Mohan
Mehbooba – R.D. Burman

Best Lyricist
 Kabhi Kabhie – Sahir Ludhianvi for Kabhi Kabhie Mere Dil Mein 
Dharam Karam – Majrooh Sultanpuri for Ik Din Bik Jayega
Kabhi Kabhie – Sahir Ludhianvi for Main Pal Do Pal Ka
Mausam – Gulzar for Dil Dhoondta Hai
Mehbooba – Anand Bakshi for Mere Naina Sawan Bhadon

Best Playback Singer, Male
 Kabhi Kabhie – Mukesh for Kabhi Kabhie Mere Dil Mein 
Chitchor – K.J. Yesudas for Gori Tera Gaon
Dharam Karam – Mukesh for Ek Din Bik Jayega
Fakira – Mahendra Kapoor for Sunke Teri Pukar
Kabhi Kabhie – Mukesh for Main Pal Do Pal Ka

Best Playback Singer, Female
 Chitchor – Hemlata for Tu Jo Mere Sur 
Barood – Asha Bhosle for I Love You
Fakira – Hemlata for Sunke Teri Pukar
Sankoch – Sulakshana Pandit for Bandhire Kahi Preet

Best Art Direction
 Fakira  – S. S. Samel

Best Cinematography
 Fakira  – Fali Mistry

Best Editing
 Balika Vadhu  – Bijoy Chowdhury

Best Sound
 Bairaag  – P. Harikishan

Critics' Awards

Best Film
 Mrigayaa

Best Documentary
 Marvel of Memory

Biggest Winners
 Kabhi Kabhie – 4/12
 Balika Badhu – 3/3
 Mausam – 2/8
 Arjun Pandit – 2/4
 Fakira – 2/4
 Chitchor – 1/4
 Bairaag – 1/3
 Tapasya –   1/3

See also
 26th Filmfare Awards
 25th Filmfare Awards
 Filmfare Awards

References

 https://www.imdb.com/event/ev0000245/1977/

Filmfare Awards
Filmfare
1977 in Indian cinema